Cv Júlio de Noronha (V-32)  was the third ship of the  of the Brazilian Navy.

Construction and career
The ship was built at Naval Arsenal Rio de Janeiro in Rio de Janeiro and was launched on 15 December 1989 and commissioned on 7 October 1992.

In May 1997, she joined F União and S Tamoio while participating at the invitation of Portugal in NATO's Linked Seas '97 Operation, held offshore between 15 and 19 May of the Iberian Peninsula, between the Portuguese coast and the Strait of Gibraltar. Among other ships, the Amyot D'Inville participated in this exercise. This exercise lasted 68 days and sailed over 12,000 nautical miles, with the GT returning to the Rio de Janeiro Naval Base on June 16th.

Gallery

References

External links

Ships built in Brazil
Inhaúma-class corvettes
1989 ships